Sosa Bluff is a rock bluff 1 nautical mile (1.9 km) south of Lisignoli Bluff in the Schneider Hills portion of the Argentina Range, Pensacola Mountains. Mapped by United States Geological Survey (USGS) from surveys and U.S. Navy air photos, 1956–67. Named by Advisory Committee on Antarctic Names (US-ACAN) for Lieutenant O.R. Sosa, Argentine officer in charge of General Belgrano Station, winter 1966.

Cliffs of Queen Elizabeth Land